Judge for Yourselves! (subtitle: For Self-Examination, Recommended to the Present Age, Second Series) is a work by Danish philosopher Søren Kierkegaard.  It was written as part of Kierkegaard's second authorship and published posthumously in 1876.  This work is a continuation of For Self-Examination.  This work continues a critique of Christendom, Christianity as a social and political entity, and its cultural accommodation.  Kierkegaard discusses Bishop Jacob Mynster as a representative of Christendom and one of the main reasons Judge for Yourselves! was not published in Kierkegaard's lifetime was of his personal respect for Mynster.

Notes

1876 books
Books by Søren Kierkegaard